Aurélia Mengin-Lecreulx is a Réunionnaise actress, director and producer. She is the founder and director of the "Even Not Fear" Festival.

Her 2018 film Fornacis, the first to be directed by a woman from Réunion, won first prize at the Girona Film festival.

Filmography 
Adam moins Eve, 2015
 Fornacis, 2018

Awards
2015 Best long short film, Open World Film Festival, Toronto
2015 Best African Director, Festival International du Cinéma du Nigéria
2018 Girona Film Festival, First prize.

References 

Film directors from Réunion
Living people
Place of birth missing (living people)
Women from Réunion
Year of birth missing (living people)